Thirteen Strings is a chamber orchestra in Ottawa, Ontario, Canada. It was founded in 1976 by Brian Law, then conductor of the Ottawa Symphony Orchestra, who led the ensemble until 1991. Its initial members were drawn from the National Arts Centre Orchestra. The performances are often supplemented by vocal or instrumental soloists. Jean-François Rivest was the Artistic Director from 1999 to 2006. The present Artistic Director is Kevin Mallon. The ensemble performs in such venues as St Andrew's Presbyterian Church and Dominion-Chalmers United Church. 
Thirteen strings also organizes Junior Thirteen Strings, which consists of Ottawa region teen string players ages 12–17 carefully selected to play with the Thirteen Strings in a concert during their regular season.

Composition of the Thirteen Strings
Please note that the members of Thirteen Strings vary from time to time depending on the musicians schedules. The current players in the Thirteen Strings are:

Julian Armour - cello

Brigitte Amyot - violin II

Hilda Cowie - bass

Martine Dubé - violin I

Andréa Armijo Fortrin - violin I

Guylaine Lamaire - viola

Manuela Milani - violin I

Thaddeus Morden - cello

Maria Nenoiu - violin II

David Thies-Thompson - violin II

Solange Tremblay - violin II

Peter Webster - viola

Other members

Louis-Pierre Bergeron - horn

Marie Bouchard - harpsichord

Camille Churchfield - flute

Christian Paquette - flute

Julie Paul - Oboe

References
 Concert Program dated 27 April 2012, Thirteen Strings Chamber Orchestra

External links
 Official Website
 Thirteen Strings photos  http://www.facebook.com/media/set/?set=a.280716455344983.65085.280682838681678&type=1
 Thirteen Strings music    http://music.cbc.ca/#/artists/Thirteen-Strings

Canadian classical music groups
Musical groups from Ottawa
Musical groups established in 1976
1976 establishments in Ontario